Off-roading is the activity of driving or riding in a vehicle on unpaved surfaces such as sand, gravel, riverbeds, mud, snow, rocks, and other natural terrain. Types of off-roading range in intensity, from leisure drives with unmodified vehicles, to competitions with customized vehicles and professional drivers. Off-roaders have been met with criticism for the environmental damage caused by their vehicles. There have also been extensive debates over the role of government in regulating the sport, including a Supreme Court case brought against the Bureau of Land Management in the United States.

Off-road vehicle 

Travelling over difficult terrain requires vehicles capable of off-road driving such as ATVs. These vehicles have features designed specifically for use in off-road conditions such as extended ground clearance, off-road tires and a strengthened drive-train. Some manufacturers offer vehicles specifically designed for off-road use.

Recreational off-roading 
Some examples of recreational off-roading include the following:

Dune bashing 

Dune bashing is a form of off-roading on sand dunes.

A large sport-utility vehicle such as the Toyota Land Cruiser is used (however, lightweight vehicles often fare better in the extremely soft sand found on sand dunes). Vehicles driven on dunes may be equipped with a roll cage in case of an overturn;  Similar to auto-racing, experience and skill is required to maneuver the car and prevent accidents. Before entering the desert in an everyday-use SUV or pickup, it is essential to reduce the tire pressure. This is done to gain more traction by increasing the footprint of the tire and, therefore, reducing the ground pressure of the vehicle on the sand as there is a greater surface area (much like a person wearing snowshoes can walk on a soft surface without sinking, but a person without them cannot). For example, tires with a recommended pressure of 35 psi would be reduced to approximately 12-15 psi.

A common modification is to fit bead lock rims, which allow tire pressure to be lowered even further, without risking tire and rim separation. Upon entering the desert, it is common to meet with a pack of vehicles and a group leader before proceeding. The group leader then leads the pack through the stunts in single file. The main reason for this technique is to prevent vehicles from losing track of direction and getting lost.

Off-road racing

Desert racing 
High-speed racing in the open desert includes chases and racing on a rough desert terrain with numerous pots and bumps at the maximum speed. Drivers mostly use Rear Wheel Drive and 4 Wheel Drive trucks with long-travel suspension, wide stance on the front and large tires which allows maintaining optimal stability at the high speed. This type of trucks are often called Prerunner. These events, depending on the specific event, can last days, even possibly spanning across hundreds of miles.

Rock racing 
Rock Racing is very similar to rock crawling in the fact that the vehicles are driven over rocks, the difference is that there are no penalties for hitting cones, backing up or winching as is done in rock crawling. Rock racing also involves a degree of high-speed racing not seen in typical rock crawling.

Rally 
See article: Rally

Mudding and mud plugging 

Mudding is off-roading through an area of wet mud or clay. The goal is to drive through as far as possible without getting stuck. There are many types of tires that are recommended for this activity. Some tires are balloon tires, mud-terrain tires and paddle tires. This activity is very popular in the United States, although it is illegal on public land due to the environmental impact.

Mud plugging, as practiced for instance in the United Kingdom, refers to the old motorsport of classic trials, where again, the main objective is to complete a challenging course of (mostly unpaved) roads and (often muddy, and frequently uphill) off-road terrain.

This form of motor sport is one of the earliest to survive to this day, dating back at least to the 1920s.

Rock crawling 
Rock crawling is a category of off-roading. Vehicles used for rock crawling are usually modified with different tires, suspension components that allow greater axle articulation, and changes in the differential gear ratio in order to obtain characteristics suitable for low speed operation for traversing obstacles. It is common for a rock crawler to have a "spotter", who is an assistant on foot by the vehicle to provide information to the driver about the areas out of sight to the driver.

Competitive trials 
All progress is made at low speed and the emphasis is on skill, rather than finishing first although trialing can be highly competitive. There are three traditional forms of off-road trialing.

RTV trialing 
RTV (Road Taxed Vehicle) trialing is the most common form of trialing. As the name suggests, it is for vehicles that are road-legal (and thus required to pay road tax). This excludes vehicles that are highly modified or specially built. RTV-class vehicles can carry a wide range of suspension modifications, as well as off-road tires (provided they are road-legal), recovery winches, raised air intakes etc. Vehicles on RTV trials are usually best described as "modified from standard"—they use the standard chassis, drive-train and body that the vehicle was built with. Whilst modification is not necessarily required for an RTV trial, at the very least the vehicle would be expected to have some under-body protection such as a sump guard, differential guard and solid sills. RTV courses are intended to be non-damaging and driven at little more than a walking pace and a course properly laid out would be drivable without damage. However, the terrain usually includes steep slopes, water, side-slopes, deep ruts and other obstacles that could potentially damage a vehicle if mistakes are made or poor driving technique is used, and vehicle modifications increase the chance of success.

RTV trials usually take place on farmland, a quarry site or at a dedicated off-road driving center, and are usually organized by a dedicated trialing body (such as the All Wheel Drive Club or The Association of Land Rover clubs in the UK), or by a vehicle owner's club. The course consists of 10 to 12 "gates" marked by two garden canes (sticks), vertically placed. The gates are just wide enough to get a standard vehicle through. One vehicle at a time attempts the course, and is deemed to have cleared a gate if at least one of the front wheel hubs passes between the canes. The vehicle's attempt ends when it comes to a stop (depending on the exact level of skill the trial is aimed at any stopping may end the attempt, or a few seconds may be allowed). Long-wheelbase vehicles are usually allowed to perform a three-point turn if needed, providing the driver declares where the turn is going to be made before they attempt the course (this puts a strong emphasis on ground-reading ability).
This can also be called a "shunt", where the driver has to attempt a gate and then shout shunt. they are then allowed a space of 1 and a half car lengths to reverse and line the car better to enter through the gate

The course between the gates is a "section": between the start line and the first gate is "Section 1", the part between the first and second gates is "Section 2" and so on. An RTV course is often laid out so that each section is progressively more difficult, although this is not always the case. If a driver fails to complete Section 1 they are given 10 points. If the attempt ends in Section 2, 9 points are awarded etc. A clear round results in gaining only 1 point. A day's event will consist of many different courses and the driver with the lowest score is the winner.

Since the terrain covered in RTV trials should be well within the capabilities of any reasonably capable vehicle (even in standard form), these trials place the emphasis on driver skill and ground-reading abilities. A good driver in a standard specification vehicle can easily win over a modified, highly equipped vehicle driven by a less competent driver.

CCV trialing 

Cross Country Vehicle (CCV) trialing is the next step up from RTV trialing and is open to non-road-legal vehicles, which greatly increases the scope for modification. The terrain covered will be of greater difficulty than that found on an RTV trial, and will usually require more judicious use of speed to get the vehicle across certain obstacles, so increasing the risk of vehicle damage. Whilst no trial is intended to be vehicle-damaging mistakes and accidents are inevitable. A standard-specification vehicle would not be expected to be able to complete a CCV course.

The event is run along the same lines as RTV, with a course made up of cane-marked gates. The rules are also the same as an RTV trial.

CCV trialing differs greatly from RTV trials in the vehicles used. Since "anything goes", CCV trials rely on having the correct vehicle to a much greater extent than in an RTV trial. Competitors are able to design and build vehicles that are much more optimized for off-road use than in the lower ranks of trialing. CCV vehicles have powerful engines, high ground clearance, light, minimalist bodywork and good approach and departure angles. For many years, in the UK, the ultimate CCV vehicle could be built by taking the chassis of a Range Rover, removing the body, cutting the chassis down to an 80-inch wheelbase and mating it to the body of a Series I Land Rover, retaining the Range Rover's V8 engine and coil-spring suspension in a light, easy to maneuver body. In recent years the value of early Land Rovers and Range Rovers has risen to the extent that this is no longer practical. CCV trailers now usually base their vehicles around Land Rover 90s or a standard 100-inch chassis from a Range Rover or Series I Discovery. The Suzuki SJ series of vehicles also make good bases for CCV-spec vehicles. Some vehicles are specially built, taking the form of light "buggies" with tractor tires and "fiddle" brakes for the best performance. 

Vehicles are required to meet certain safety regulations. Roll-cages must be fitted and be built to a suitable standard, recovery points must be fitted front and rear and fuel tanks must meet certain standards. A 4-point harness for all occupants is required and a fire extinguisher is recommended.

Off-roading events 
In some countries off-road activities are strictly regulated, while others promote cross country off-road endurance events like the Dakar Rally, Spanish Baja, Africa Eco Race, Abu Dhabi Desert Challenge, Russian Baja Northern Forest, San Felipe 250 and Baja 500 & 1000, which are a test of navigation skills and machine durability. off-road parks and motocross tracks also host several events and maybe the only legal place to off-road in the area.

Criticism of ORV use

Environmental impact 

Off-road vehicle use on public land has been criticized by some members of the U.S. government and environmental organizations including the Sierra Club and The Wilderness Society. They have noted several consequences of illegal ORV use such as pollution, trail damage, erosion, land degradation, possible species extinction, and habitat destruction which can leave hiking trails impassable. ORV proponents argue that legal use taking place under planned access along with the multiple environment and trail conservation efforts by ORV groups will mitigate these issues. Groups such as the Blueribbon Coalition advocate Treadlightly, which is the responsible use of public lands used for off-road activities.

According to the U.S. Forest Service the use of old-style two-stroke engines, previously common in vehicles designed for off-road use, also causes concerns about pollution. This is because "two-stroke engines emit about 20 to 33 percent of the consumed fuel through the exhaust" (as the engine lubricant is a "total loss system" and is emitted by design) and "discharge from two-stroke snowmobile engines can lead to indirect pollutant deposition into the top layer of snow and subsequently into the associated surface and ground water".

Noise pollution is also a concern and several studies conducted by Montana State University, California State University, University of Florida and others have cited possible negative behavioral changes in wildlife as the result of some ORV use.

Some U.S. states have laws to reduce noise generated by off-road and non-highway vehicles. Washington is one example: "State law requires off-road and other non-highway vehicles to use specified noise-muffling devices (RCW 46.09.120(1) (e) maximum limits and test procedures). State agencies and local governments may adopt regulations governing the operation of non-highway vehicles on property, streets, or highways within their jurisdiction, provided they are not less stringent than state law (RCW 46.09.180 regulation by local political subdivisions)".

Mojave desert controversy 
The U.S. Bureau of Land Management (BLM) supervises several large off-road vehicle areas in California's Mojave Desert.

In 2009, U.S. District Judge Susan Illston ruled against the BLM's proposed designation of additional off-road use on designated open routes on public land. According to the ruling the BLM violated its own regulations when it designated approximately 5,000 miles of off-road vehicle routes in 2006. According to Judge Ilston the BLM's designation was "flawed because it does not contain a reasonable range of alternatives" to limit damage to sensitive habitat, as required under the National Environmental Policy Act. Illston found that the bureau had inadequately analyzed the route's impact on air quality, soils, plant communities and sensitive species such as the endangered Mojave fringe-toed lizard, pointing out that the United States Congress has declared that the California Desert and its resources are "extremely fragile, easily scarred, and slowly healed".

The court also found that the BLM failed to follow route restrictions established in the agency's own conservation plan, resulting in the establishment of hundreds of illegal OHV routes during the previous three decades. The plan violated the BLM's own regulations, specifically the Federal Land Policy and Management Act of 1976 (FLPMA) and the National Environmental Policy Act of 1969 (NEPA). The ruling was considered a success for a coalition of conservation groups including the Friends of Juniper Flats, Community Off-road Vehicle Watch, California Native Plant Society, The Center for Biological Diversity, The Sierra Club, and The Wilderness Society who initiated the legal challenge in late 2006.

Roadless area conservation 
Many U.S. national parks have discussed or enacted roadless rules and partial or total bans on ORVs. To accommodate enthusiasts, some parks like Big Cypress National Preserve in Florida, were created specifically for ORVs and related purposes. However, such designations have not prevented damage or abuse of the policy.

Public statements 
In 2004, several environmental organizations sent a letter to Dale Bosworth, Chief of the United States Forest Service, and described the extent of damage caused by ORV use, including health threats to other people:
It is well-established that the proliferation of off-road vehicle and snowmobile use places soil, vegetation, air and water quality, and wildlife at risk through pollution, erosion, sedimentation of streams, habitat fragmentation and disturbance, and other adverse impacts to resources. These impacts cause severe and lasting damage to the natural environment on which human-powered and equestrian recreation depends and alter the remote and wild character of the backcountry. Motorized recreation monopolizes forest areas by denying other users the quiet, pristine, backcountry experience they seek. It also presents safety and health threats to other recreationists.

In 2004 the Supreme Court Justice Antonin Scalia listed several problems that result from ORV use in natural areas. From the Environmental News Service article:
Scalia noted that off-road vehicle use on federal land has "negative environmental consequences including soil disruption and compaction, harassment of animals, and annoyance of wilderness lovers.

A number of environmental organizations, including the Rangers for Responsible Recreation, are campaigning to draw attention to a growing threat posed by off-road vehicle misuse and to assist overmatched land managers in addressing ORV use impacts. These campaigns in part have prompted congressional hearings about the growing impact of unmanaged off-road vehicle use.

The House Natural Resources Committee Subcommittee on National Parks, Forests and Public Lands held an oversight hearing on "The Impacts of Unmanaged Off-Road Vehicles on Federal Land" on March 13, 2008. A second hearing on off-highway vehicle (OHV) management on public lands was held by the Senate Energy and Natural Resources Committee on June 5, 2008. The Senate committee hearing was convened for the purpose of finding out why the agencies are failing to grapple with the negative impacts of off-road vehicle use on US public lands and what the agencies might need to start doing differently. For the first time in perhaps a decade, members of the Senate Energy and Natural Resources Committee grilled leaders of the Forest Service and the BLM about why off-road vehicle use is being allowed to damage America's national treasures.

Taking center stage in the discussion was the "travel planning process", a complex analysis and decision-making procedure with the aim of designating appropriate roads and trails. Both the Forest Service and BLM have been engaged in somewhat similar travel planning processes now for years, but some of the committee members didn't seem to think those processes were going along so well. "The BLM has identified travel management on its lands as ‘one of the greatest management challenges’ it faces," stated committee Chairman Jeff Bingaman, D-NM. "Likewise, the Forest Service has identified unmanaged recreation — including ORV use — as one of the top four threats to the management and health of the National Forest System. Despite these statements, it seems to me that neither agency has been able to successfully manage off-road use."

"Existing rules for managing off-road vehicles are not being enforced," Bingaman added, and the agencies are ignoring unregulated use "with significant consequences for the health of our public lands and communities, and adverse effects on other authorized public land uses."

See also 
 Amphibious vehicle
 Baja Bug
 Game viewer vehicle
 Mud bogging
 Ramp travel index
 Suspension (vehicle)
 Off-road tire
 Breakover angle
 Approach and departure angles
 Ground Clearance
 Overlanding
 Adventure Motorcycle
 Dirt Bike
 ATV
 UTV
 MTB

Further reading 
Environmental Hazards of Dune Bashing
Sand Duning and Off-Roading in the Desert

References

Notes

Bibliography

External links 

Man-made erosion, The National Trust (UK)
Offroadlounge, A Valuable Resource for Offroaders

 
Outdoor recreation
Human impact on the environment